The 13th Signals Group was a military communications brigade sized formation of the British Army.  The group was established in 1967 to control the territorial signals regiments with national communication duties in the United Kingdom. It was later disbanded in 1974, when it merged with the 2nd Signal Group.

History 
The group was formed in 1967 for the overall command of the territorial signal regiments with "National Communication" duties. Its units were specifically tasked with helping local and national signals with helping governmental and military major organizations; I.e. Ministry of Defence and 2nd Infantry Division.  Because of cuts later on, It was later absorbed into the 2nd Signal Group, in 1972.

Structure 
The structure of the group stayed the same its entire history.  Upon formation, it included the following units:

HQ 13th Signal Group 
32 (Scottish) Signal Regiment (Volunteers)
Headquarters Squadron
51 (Highland) Signal Squadron
52 (Lowland) Signal Squadron
61 (City of Edinburgh) Signal Squadron
82 (Army Emergency Reserve) Signal Squadron
37th (Wessex and Welsh) Signal Regiment (Volunteers)
Headquarters Squadron
43 (Wessex) Signal Squadron
53 (Welsh) Signal Squadron
57 (City and County of Bristol) Signal Squadron
38 (City of Sheffield) Signal Regiment (Volunteers)
64 (City of Sheffield) Headquarters Squadron
46 (Derbyshire) Signal Squadron
87 (City of Nottingham) Signal Squadron
93 (East Lancashire) Signal Squadron

References 

Group sized units of the British Army
Communications units and formations of the British Army
Military units and formations established in 1967
Military units and formations disestablished in 1972